Mohammad Keshavarz (born 5 July 1982) is an Iranian professional futsal coach and former player. He is currently head coach of Giti Pasand in the Iranian Futsal Super League.

Honours

Player 
Country
 FIFA Futsal World Cup
 Third place (1): 2016
 AFC Futsal Championship
 Champion (5): 2004 – 2007 – 2008 – 2010 – 2016
 Asian Indoor and Martial Arts Games
 Champion (2): 2007 – 2013
 Confederations Futsal Cup
 Champion (1): 2009
 Grand Prix
 Runner-Up (3): 2007 – 2009 – 2015
 WAFF Futsal Championship
 Champion (2): 2007 – 2012

Club
 AFC Futsal Club Championship
 Champion (4): 2006 (Shensa) – 2010 (Foolad Mahan) – 2012 (Giti Pasand) – 2015 (Tasisat Daryaei)
 Runner-Up (3): 2011 (Shahid Mansouri) – 2013 (Giti Pasand) – 2017 (Giti Pasand)
 Iranian Futsal Super League
 Champion (7): 2003–04 (Shensa) – 2005–06 (Shensa) –  2009–10 (Foolad Mahan) – 2010–11 (Shahid Mansouri) – 2012–13 (Giti Pasand) – 2015–16 (Tasisat Daryaei) – 2016–17 (Giti Pasand)
 Runner-Up (5): 2007–08 (Shahid Mansouri) – 2011–12 (Giti Pasand) – 2013–14 (Giti Pasand) – 2014–15 (Giti Pasand) – 2018–19 (Giti Pasand)

Manager 
 Iranian Futsal Super League
 Runner-Up (1): 2014–15 (Giti Pasand)

Individual 
 Best player:
 2011 AFC Futsal Player of the Year
 2011 AFC Futsal Club Championship
 2012 AFC Futsal Club Championship
 2013–14 Iranian Futsal Super League Best Defender (Giti Pasand)

Managerial career

Statistics

References

External links
 Official website
 
 
 

1982 births
Living people
People from Ray, Iran
Iranian men's futsal players
Futsal defenders
Shensa Saveh FSC players
Shahid Mansouri FSC players
Foolad Mahan FSC players
Giti Pasand FSC players
Tasisat Daryaei FSC players
Iranian futsal coaches
Giti Pasand FSC managers
21st-century Iranian people